Tutt may refer to:

People 
 Andy Tutt (born 1968), British cricketer
 Charles L. Tutt III (1911–1993), President of the American Society of Mechanical Engineers 1975–1976
 J. W. Tutt (1858–1911), British entomologist 
 Jason Tutt (born 1991), Australian rules footballer
 Ron Tutt (born 1938), drummer for Elvis Presley and Neil Diamond
 William Thayer Tutt (1912–1989), American ice hockey executive
 Julian Rhind-Tutt (born 1967), British actor

Other uses
 River Tutt, a tributary of the River Ure, North Yorkshire, England
 Tropical upper tropospheric trough, in meteorology
 TUTT (linguistics), the time of utterance in linguistics
 Tutt Brothers (1882–1951), American vaudeville producers, writers, and performers
 Tutt Library at Colorado College, Colorado Springs, Colorado, U.S.

See also
 Tutt Hill (disambiguation)